The  is a Buddhist temple located in the Yawase neighborhood of the city of Inazawa, Aichi, Japan. The temple belongs to the Myōshin-ji branch of the Rinzai school of Japanese Zen. Its main image is a statue of Yakushi Nyōrai. It is the modern successor of one of the provincial temples established by Emperor Shōmu during the Nara period (710 – 794) for the purpose of promoting Buddhism as the national religion of Japan and standardising control of Yamato rule over the provinces. The foundation stones of the original temple was designated as a National Historic Site by the Japanese government in 2012.

Owari Kokubun-ji ruins

The Owari Kokubun-ji was founded in 741 as the provincial temple of Owari Province, and is located approximately 900 meters south of its modern incarnation. The site is located on the a natural levee on the left bank of the Miyake River, and the ruins of the provincial capital of the province are four kilometers to the north-northeast. The template compound measures approximately 300 meters north-to-south by 200 meters east-to-west, although the exact dimensions have not been completely surveyed. Within this compound, the layout of the buildings was in accordance with the standardized "Shichidō garan" formation in a north–south line, similar to Tōdai-ji in Nara, upon which the kokubunji temples were based. 

The foundation stones of the Kondō indicate that it was a 25.6 x 21.6 meter structure erected on a tiled platform. Only two cornerstones of the foundations of the Kōdō (Lecture Hall) have been found, but it also built on a tiled platform. The pagoda had a foundation 14.7 meters square. It is estimated to have had three, or perhaps five stories, due to the weak foundation. 

No remains of the South Gate, Middle Gate, and only a small portion of the cloisters have yet been discovered, as most of the site is on private land, and a complete archaeological excavation has not been conducted. 

The Owari Kokubun-ji is mentioned several times in the 8th century Shoku Nihongi and per an entry in the Nihon Kiryaku dated 884 AD, the temple burned down. There is no record of it being rebuilt, but its location was preserved as a local place name into the Edo period. The location was commemorated by a stone monument in 1915. From 1961–2013, a total of 17 excavations were conducted. 

Shingon Risshu sect records make mention of an Owari Kokubun-ji in the year 920 and such a temple is listed as a subsidiary of Saidai-ji in Nara in 1391; however, this appears to be reference to an unrelated temple.

Current Owari Kokubun-ji
The present-day Owari Kokubun-ji was formerly called Enko-ji (円興寺) and was renamed to its present name in 1886. The foundation of Enko-ji is not certain, but is believed to be either 1328 or 1375 from temple records and was relocated to its present location in the early 17th century. At the time, a Shaka-dō chapel containing a Yakushi Nyōrai statue claimed to be from the original Owari Kokubun-ji was merged with Enko-ji, and the temple renamed itself due to the greater prestige of the ancient name.

The temple has five wooden statues from the Kamakura or Muromachi periods; (two statues of Shaka Nyōrai, two statues of the kami of Atsuta Shrine and one statue of the founding priest Dengakuzan) which are listed as National Important Cultural Properties of Japan.   

The temple is a 15-minute walk from the "Yawase Kannon-mae" bus stop on the Meitetsu bus from Konomiya Station on the Meitetsu Nagoya Main Line.

See also
List of Historic Sites of Japan (Aichi)
provincial temple

References

External links

 Inazawa City home page
Aichi Cultural Properties Navi

Historic Sites of Japan
Inazawa
Owari Province
8th-century establishments in Japan
Nara period
Buddhist archaeological sites in Japan
Myoshin-ji temples